Nguyễn Đăng Kính (born 1941 in Nam Định Province) was a Mikoyan-Gurevich MiG-21 pilot of the Vietnamese People's Air Force who flew with the 921st Fighter Regiment from 1965-1972, becoming a deputy commander of the newly established 927th FR from 1972-75, and tied for fourth place amongst Vietnam War fighter aces with six kills.

The following list of victories include the kills credited to him by the VPAF:
 21 July 1966, a USAF Firebee/Lightning Bug unmanned aerial vehicle drone;
 05 December 1966, USAF F-105D Thunderchief (pilot Begley, KIA);
 8 November 1967, an American F-4 Phantom II (pilot Gordon, WSO Brenneman);
 19 November 1967, a USAF EB-66 (shared kill with Vũ Ngọc Đỉnh);
 3 January 1968, a USAF F-105D (pilot Bean);
 14 January 1968, a USAF EB-66C (pilots Mercer and Terrell + 5) (shared kill with Dong Van Song);
 3 March 1968, a USAF EB-66 (shared kill with a pilot named "Thanh");
 21 September 1968, a USAF Firebee/Lightning Bug UAV drone;
 26 October 1968, an F-4 Phantom II (US-side does not confirm).

See also
 List of Vietnam War flying aces
 Weapons of the Vietnam War

References

Bibliography

North Vietnamese military personnel of the Vietnam War
North Vietnamese Vietnam War flying aces
Living people
1941 births